The Museum of Russian Icons is the first in Moscow and the second in Russia private collection of the works of the Old Russian art.

History

The Museum of Russian Icons was founded by a Rosgosstrakh manager Mikhail Abramov. It started as a private collection of Byzantine and Old Russian art that obtained the official status of public museum and became member of the IСOM (International Council of Museums). The museum's collection totals about 4,000 works including about 600 icons.

The Museum first opened its doors in May 2006 and at that time it occupied a hall in the Vereyskaya Plaza business center. Four years later collection was moved to premises in Goncharnaya street in downtown Moscow.

Hours and Admission 

The museum is open daily except Wednesday from 11:00 to 19:00. Admission is free

See also 
Ryabushinsky Museum of Icons and Paintings

References

External links 

 Museum of russian icons website
 The official Russian museums list
 Museum opening (in Russian)
 Museum director detained after buying stolen icon worth $1 mln, Gazeta.ru, 17 May 2012

Art museums and galleries in Moscow
Russian art
Art museums established in 2006
2006 establishments in Russia